Jimmy Alfredo Bran Orozco (born July 15, 1979) is an Ecuadorian footballer who plays as a midfielder for the top-level Ecuadorian club Rocafuerte.

Playing style
Bran is a very typical defensive midfielder, that covers a lot of terrain on the pitch being very fast and using very aggressive tackles and tight marking. Once he recuperates the ball he tends to pass it very quickly to his nearest teammate.

Although he is mainly a defensive midfielder he can play in several positions in the back specially as wingback in both sides of the pitch.

Career
He played most of his career in Quito for El Nacional where he was part of the team that took the 2005 and 2006 Ecuadorian championship, although he was mainly a substitute player. Then he was released and had a short spell in Ecuador's Serie B playing for Manta F.C., the next year he returned to the first division with the then newly promoted Deportivo Azogues where he had a terrific year and was called up to defend the Ecuador National team several times. In 2008 he was transferred to Deportivo Cuenca and, due to a financial crisis, the club had to release him; he was quickly picked up by former youth team and Ecuadorian, Emelec.

External links

1979 births
Living people
Sportspeople from Guayaquil
Association football midfielders
Ecuadorian footballers
Ecuador international footballers
C.S. Emelec footballers
C.D. El Nacional footballers
Manta F.C. footballers
Deportivo Azogues footballers
C.D. Cuenca footballers
C.D. Olmedo footballers
C.S.D. Independiente del Valle footballers
C.D. Técnico Universitario footballers